This is the first edition of the Miss American Beauty pageant. The Miss American Beauty pageant was created to select a USA representative to the Miss International. A live pageant was held from 1963 to 1967. After that time, there is no actual documentation that a pageant was actually held for the USA representative. The Miss American Beauty title continued to be used for the USA representative to Miss International until approximately 2003.

1963 beauty pageants
Beauty pageants in the United States